St. John's Mercy Hospital Building is a historic hospital building located at Springfield, Greene County, Missouri. The building was constructed in four stages: The original section was built in 1906 (demolished about 1970); a separate convent was constructed in 1914; a four-story Jacobethan addition was added in 1922; and in 1944 a four-story unit and gymnasium were constructed.  The brick and limestone building features Tudor arch and segmental arch openings.

It was listed on the National Register of Historic Places in 2003.

References

Hospital buildings on the National Register of Historic Places in Missouri
Tudor Revival architecture in Missouri
Hospital buildings completed in 1914
Buildings and structures in Springfield, Missouri
National Register of Historic Places in Greene County, Missouri